Jakarta Arts Council Novel Competition (in Indonesia: Sayembara Novel Dewan Kesenian Jakarta) is an annual novel competition held by Jakarta Arts Council in Indonesia. It was first known as the 'Romance Writing Competition' and was discontinued in 1980 due to the decline in the quality of submissions according to the Abdul Hadi WM, the Chairman of the Jakarta Arts Council Literary Committee at the time. It was changed to a literary prize award in 1981–1984, but no literary or novel competitions were held between 1984 and 1996. The novel competition was held again in 1997-1998 and 2003 and 2006 before being regularly held every two years from 2016 on.

The competition is considered prestigious, with first prize of twenty million rupiah (approximately US$2,000).

References

External links
 Jakarta Art Council official website (English and Indonesian)

Indonesian literary awards
Fiction awards